De Witt Cottage, also known as Holland Cottage and Wittenzand, is a historic home located at Virginia Beach, Virginia.  It was built in 1895, and is a two-story, "L" shaped oceanfront brick cottage surrounded on three sides by a one-story porch.  It has Queen Anne style decorative detailing.  It has a full basement and hipped roof with dormers.  A second floor was added to the kitchen wing in 1917.  The de Witt family continuously occupied the house as a permanent residence from 1909 to 1988.

It was added to the National Register of Historic Places in 1988.

Atlantic Wildfowl Heritage Museum
Since 1995 the cottage has been home to the Atlantic Wildfowl Heritage Museum. The museum displays include bird decoys, bird art and sculptures, vintage shotguns, hunting memorabilia, and a pictorial history of Virginia Beach.

References

External links
 Atlantic Wildfowl Heritage Museum

Houses on the National Register of Historic Places in Virginia
Queen Anne architecture in Virginia
Houses completed in 1895
Houses in Virginia Beach, Virginia
National Register of Historic Places in Virginia Beach, Virginia